Australoplana alba is a species of flatworm.

Taxonomy
Australoplana alba contains the following subspecies:
 Australoplana alba roseolineata
 Australoplana alba alba

References

Geoplanidae